Gallagher is an unincorporated community in Kanawha County, West Virginia, United States. Gallagher has a post office with ZIP code 25083. It was also called Mucklow.

References

Unincorporated communities in Kanawha County, West Virginia
Unincorporated communities in West Virginia
Coal towns in West Virginia